Studyony is a rural locality (a settlement) in Kolenovskoye Rural Settlement, Novokhopyorsky District, Voronezh Oblast, Russia. The population was 57 as of 2010.

Geography 
Studyony is located 41 km west of Novokhopyorsk (the district's administrative centre) by road. Dimitrovsky is the nearest rural locality.

References 

Populated places in Novokhopyorsky District